Giorgio Capece (born 5 March 1992) is an Italian footballer who plays as a midfielder for  club Ravenna.

Biography
In June 2010, a few days before the closure of 2009–10 financial year (on 30 June), Capece along with Salvatore Margarita were sold to Calcio Catania for a total fee of €2 million in co-ownership deal. Co-currently Ascoli signed half of the registration rights of Federico Moretti also for €2 million. Capece and Margarita also returned to Ascoli for 2010–11 Serie B and the reserve team. In June 2011 the three players returned to their respective clubs. Capece, Margarita and Daniele Rosania were loaned to Lanciano in new 2011–12 Lega Pro Prima Divisione season and won promotion to Serie B. Capece also received an average vote of 6.32/10 by La Gazzetta dello Sport, ranked 8th among players of Lega Pro born 1991 or after.

On 1 September 2014 Capece signed a 1+1 contract with SPAL.

On 16 January 2019 he signed with Paganese.

On 27 September 2020 he joined Serie D club Bitonto.

On 16 August 2021 he returned to his hometown club Fermana on a one-year contract.

On 9 December 2022, he joined Ravenna.

References

External links
 Ascoli profile   
 Lega Serie B Profile 
 

1992 births
Living people
People from Fermo
Sportspeople from the Province of Fermo
Italian footballers
Association football midfielders
Serie B players
Serie C players
Serie D players
Ascoli Calcio 1898 F.C. players
S.S. Virtus Lanciano 1924 players
S.P.A.L. players
S.S. Arezzo players
Cosenza Calcio players
S.S. Juve Stabia players
Fermana F.C. players
Paganese Calcio 1926 players
Ravenna F.C. players
U.S. Bitonto players
Italy youth international footballers
Footballers from Marche